Karpukhin, female form Karpukhina, is a Russian surname. Notable people with the surname include:

Artur Karpukhin (born 1995), Russian footballer
Viktor Karpukhin (disambiguation)
Elena Karpukhina
Nadezhda Karpukhina

Russian-language surnames